Nazir rocket launcher (robot) is an armed robot, made by Islamic Republic of Iran Army Ground Forces, unveiled on 12 September 2015. This remote-controlled missile launcher is capable to carry two missiles and approximately 600 kg of cargo; it also can perform missions based on instant planning/control.

The operating radius of this unmanned armed robot in the first phase is about 2 km. This UGV which possesses radio-guided capabilities, has a range of about 4 kilometers and is able to carry out its duty unexpectedly at air/ground operational levels.

See also 
 List of military equipment manufactured in Iran
 Armed Forces of the Islamic Republic of Iran
 Defense industry of Iran

References

External links 
 Nazir rocket launcher (robot)

Military equipment of Iran
Armoured fighting vehicles of Iran
Post–Cold War military equipment of Iran
Post–Cold War weapons of Iran
Unmanned ground combat vehicles